is a Japanese manufacturer and trading company of photographic accessories, especially known for its teleconverters and filters. Located in Tokyo, it has been producing conversion lenses since the 1960s. It produces camera lenses under the Kenko and Tokina brand names. It also manufactures a beginner's 35 mm SLR camera (using the Nikon F-mount) under the Kenko name. On June 22, 2011, Tokina announces its merger with Kenko.

Lenses
For current Kenko teleconverters and lens extension rings see List of Nikon compatible lenses with integrated autofocus-motor (note that Canon EF versions also exist).

See also
Canon Extender EF
Nikon F-mount teleconverter
Tokina
List of Kenko teleconverters with Nikon F-mount
Formatt Hitech

References

External links
 Kenko Global - Products

Photography companies of Japan
Manufacturing companies based in Tokyo
Japanese brands
Optics manufacturing companies
1957 establishments in Japan
Manufacturing companies established in 1957
Lens manufacturers